Nebtuwi is an ancient Egyptian goddess personifying fertility, wife of Khnum. Her name translates as "the lady of the fields." The cult centre of her was Latopolis. Functions of Nebtuwi were close to the functions of goddesses like Isis and Hathor. Subsequently, Nebtuwi's cult was gradually relegated to the cult of Neith.

References 

Egyptian goddesses
Fertility goddesses